Hoeloceras is an extinct orthoconic nautiloid cephalopod from the upper Ordovician, generally included in the Actinocerida.
Nautiloids are a subclass of shelled cephalopods that were once diverse and numerous but are now represented by only a couple of genera, Nautilus and Allonautilus.

Hoeloceras, which has a straight shell with a broadly curved to almost flattened venter on the underside and a more highly arched dorsum on the upper, meeting acutely on either side, was named by Walter Sweet in 1958 (Chen & Liu 1977, Teichert 1964) who first recognized it in Ordovician sediments near Oslo, Norway, and included it in the Actinocerida.

Teichert (1964) identified Hoeloceras as a synonym of Lambeoceras, as the acutely angled dorso-ventral seam suggests.  Flower (1968) referred to Hoeloceras as a "flatfish", in common with Lambeoceras and Gonioceras, but reassigned it to the Reudemannoceratidae (Discosorida) noting that neither (siphuncular) annuli or parispatium - diagnostic of the Actinocerida - had been observed.

Since then specimens identified as Hoeloceras, and retained in the Actinocerida, have been discovered in China (Chen& Liu) and Korea (Yun, Cheol-Soo), where, in Korea, it is associated with the actinocerids, Armenoceras, Ormoceras, and Selkirkoceras.

See also 

List of nautiloids

References 

 Teichert 1964, Actinoceratoidea, Treatise on Invertebrate Paleontology Part K, (Nautiloidea) Geological Society of America and University of Kansas Press. pp K208 -K210.
 Flower 1968, The First Great Expansion of the Actinoceroids, Memoir 19, Part I, New Mexico Bureau of Mines and Mineral Resources, Socorro, NM.
 Chen et Liu, 1977 Hoeloceras yimengshanense ; Google translation from the Chinese.
 Yun, Cheol-Soo, Biogeographical Characteristics of the Ordovician Cephalopods from Korea.       
 Sepkoski, J.J. Jr. 2002. A compendium of fossil marine animal genera. D.J. Jablonski & M.L. Foote (eds.). Bulletins of American Paleontology 363: 1–560. Sepkoski's Online Genus Database (CEPHALOPODA)

Nautiloids